Severino Requejo (5 September 1941 – 2 April 2012) was a Spanish sports shooter. He competed in the 50 metre pistol event at the 1972 Summer Olympics.

References

1941 births
2012 deaths
Spanish male sport shooters
Olympic shooters of Spain
Shooters at the 1972 Summer Olympics
Place of birth missing
20th-century Spanish people